Mojo Pizza is an Indian pizza (delivery-only) brand, incorporated in 2017. It takes online orders through its app and website. Mojo Pizza claims to serve double toppings on their pizzas.

History
Mojo Pizza was founded by Anshul Gupta and Amit Raj, who also own BOX8. Anshul from IIT Bombay was previously an analyst at Deutsche Bank, and Amit from IIT Kharagpur previously worked for Deutsche Bank as a senior analyst.

Operations
Mojo Pizza is a full-stack cloud kitchen pizza brand with 120+ stores across Mumbai, Pune, Bangalore, and Gurgaon. The entire value chain: procurement, preparation, and delivery is owned by the company.

During the COVID-19 pandemic lockdown, around 6 lakh pizzas were reported to be sold.

References

Pizza franchises
Pizza chains of India
Food and drink companies based in Mumbai
2017 establishments in Maharashtra
Indian companies established in 2017
Food and drink companies established in 2017